San Mateo is a city in San Mateo County, California, United States, on the San Francisco Peninsula. About 20 miles (32 km) south of San Francisco, the city borders Burlingame to the north, Hillsborough to the west, San Francisco Bay and Foster City to the east and Belmont to the south. The population was 105,661 at the 2020 census.

San Mateo has a Mediterranean climate and is known for its rich history at the center of the San Francisco Bay Area. Some of the biggest economic drivers for the city include technology, health care and education.

History

The Ramaytush people lived in the land, prior to its becoming the city of San Mateo.

Spanish era
In 1789, the Spanish missionaries had named a Native American village along Laurel Creek as Los Laureles or the Laurels (Mission Dolores, 1789). At the time of Mexican Independence, 30 native Californians were at San Mateo, most likely from the Salson tribelet.

Mexican era 

Captain Frederick William Beechey in 1827 traveling with the hills on their right, known in that part as the Sierra del Sur, began to approach the road, which passing over a small eminence, opened out upon "a wide country of meadow land, with clusters of fine oak free from underwood... It strongly resembled a nobleman's park: herds of cattle and horses were grazing upon the rich pasture, and numerous fallow‑deer, startled at the approach of strangers, bounded off to seek protection among the hills... This spot is named San Matheo, and belongs to the mission of San Francisco."

The city of San Mateo was documented by Spanish colonists as part of the Rancho de las Pulgas (literally "Ranch of the Fleas") and the Rancho San Mateo, the earliest history is held in the archives of Mission Dolores.

Post-Conquest era 
In the 1850s, following the American Conquest of California, many San Franciscans began building summer homes in the mid-Peninsula, because of the milder climate. While most of this early settlement occurred in adjacent Hillsborough and Burlingame, a number of historically important mansions and buildings were constructed in San Mateo.

A.P. Giannini, founder of the Bank of Italy (which later became the Bank of America), lived here most of his life. His mansion, Seven Oaks, is listed in the National Register of Historic Places (No. 99001181). Located at 20 El Cerrito Avenue, it has been deteriorating as it has not been preserved or occupied for years.

In 1858, Sun Water Station, a stage station of the Butterfield Overland Mail route, was established in San Mateo.

The Howard Estate was built in 1859 on the hill accessed by Crystal Springs Road. The Parrott Estate was erected in 1860 in the same area, giving rise to two conflicting names for the hill, Howard Hill and Parrot Hill. After use of the automobile changed traffic patterns, neither historic name was commonly applied to that hill.  The Borel Estate was developed near Borel Creek in 1874. It has been redeveloped since the late 20th century for use as modern offices and shops. The property is managed and owned by Borel Place Associates and the Borel Estate Company.

Hayward Park, the 1880 American Queen Anne-style residence of Alvinza Hayward (often said to be "California's first millionaire" from his silver and banking fortunes), was built on an  estate in San Mateo which included a deer park and racetrack, roughly bounded by present-day El Camino Real (on the west), 9th Avenue (on the north), B Street (on the east) and 16th Avenue (on the south). A smaller portion of the property and the mansion, was converted into The Peninsula Hotel in 1908, following Hayward's death in 1904. The hotel burned down in a spectacular fire on 25 June 1920.

20th century 

In 1893, Pedro Evencio had been called the last of the Ramaytush Native American of San Mateo. However his descendant, Joseph (José) Evencio (the younger) lived at Coyote Point until World War II; his final whereabouts are unknown.

In the early 20th century, Japanese immigrants came to San Mateo to work in the salt ponds and flower industry. Although Japanese-Americans only account for 2.2% of the population today, they continue to be a major cultural influence and a draw for the rest of the region. The Eugene J. De Sabla Japanese Teahouse and Garden was established in 1894 at 70 De Sabla Road, designed by Makoto Hagiwara, designer of the Japanese garden in Golden Gate Park in San Francisco. He arranged for Japanese artisans to be brought to the United States primarily for its teahouse construction. 

The parcel was purchased in 1988 by San Francisco businessman Achille Paladini and wife Joan, who have restored it. The garden features hundreds of varieties of plants and several rare trees. A large koi pond surrounds an island. The property was placed on the National Register of Historic Places in 1992.

In December 1967, Sgt. Joe Artavia, then serving in Vietnam with Alpha Company, 1st Battalion, 327th Infantry Regiment of the 101st Airborne Division wrote to his sister, Linda Giese, who was a resident of San Carlos working in San Mateo, asking if San Mateo or San Francisco could adopt the company, saying that it would bring "the morale of the guys up as high as the clouds". San Mateo passed a resolution on March 4, 1968, officially adopting Alpha Company and letters and gifts began arriving from the citizens of San Mateo. Joe would be killed in action on March 24, 1968, less than three weeks after the resolution. Linda would travel to Vietnam to meet with the men of Alpha Company for Christmas in 1968 and deliver personalized medallions from the City of San Mateo. In 1972, San Mateo requested and received permission to have Alpha Company visit the city when they left Vietnam, later holding a parade in January 1972, believed to be the only parade honoring the military during the Vietnam War. In 1988, Joseph Brazan wrote a screenplay entitled A Dove Among Eagles chronicling the adoption of Alpha Company by San Mateo and the real-life romance between Linda and Artavia's commander, Lt. Stephen Patterson. The city expanded its support to the entire 1st Battalion in 1991, when they were deployed to Kuwait under Operation Desert Storm.

Bay Meadows horse-racing track was torn down in 2008.

21st century 
In the November 2022 election, Councilmember Diane Papan was elected to the California State Assembly, creating a vacancy on the 5-person City Council. At the December 5, 2022 council reorganization meeting, two of the remaining four councilmembers chose not to follow the standard precedent of selecting a new Mayor, which normally rotates to the councilmember who has been in office the longest.  With the vote split at 2-2, the city went a week without a Mayor.  After a second meeting that also ended without a decision, Amourence Lee was selected as the Mayor at the third meeting on December 12.

Geography

San Mateo is located at  (37.554286, −122.313044).

The best-known natural area is Coyote Point Park, a rock outcropped peninsula that juts out into the San Francisco Bay. The early Spanish navigators named it la punta de San Mateo. Crews of American cargo ships carrying grain in the bay renamed it Big Coyote. Sailors had a penchant for naming promontories at the edge of San Francisco Bay after the coyote; across the bay in Fremont are the Coyote Hills, part of Coyote Hills Regional Park.  By the 1890s, the shore area was developed as a popular beach called San Mateo Beach. In 1842, the Spanish had named it playa de San Mateo. Today, Coyote Point is home to CuriOdyssey, formerly known as the Coyote Point Museum, a major natural history museum and wildlife center in the state. The animal care facility for the Peninsula Humane Society is also situated at Coyote Point, where the adoption facility is located in Burlingame, CA.

The variety of natural habitats includes mixed oak woodland, riparian zones, and bayland marshes. One endangered species, the California clapper rail, was sighted feeding on mudflats by the Third Avenue bridge in San Mateo.  The marsh areas are also likely habitat for the endangered salt marsh harvest mouse, which inhabits the middle and high zones of salt and brackish marshes, as well as for the endangered marsh plant, Point Reyes bird's beak.

Sugarloaf Mountain, whose name has been documented in 1870, is a prominent landform between the forks of Laurel Creek. In the late 20th century, this mixed oak woodland and chaparral habitat was a site of controversy related to proposals to develop a portion of the mountain for residential use. It has been preserved for use as park and open space area, and is home to the endangered mission blue butterfly.

Sawyer Camp Trail, located on the western edge of San Mateo along the Crystal Springs Reservoir, is another popular destination for joggers, pedestrians, and bikers. This roughly  trail begins in San Mateo and stretches north toward Hillsborough and San Bruno, parallel to the 280 freeway.

Neighborhoods

In general, San Mateo's downtown core and the neighborhoods east of El Camino Real are more populous and have a greater density than the neighborhoods to the west of El Camino Real, where there is a lower population density.

Downtown
San Mateo has one of the larger, better-developed suburban downtowns in the San Francisco Bay Area. It is located roughly between Tilton Ave. to the northwest, 9th Ave. to the southeast, Delaware St. to the northeast and El Camino Real to the southwest. The downtown core contains over 800 shops and restaurants, many located in historic buildings from the late 19th and early 20th centuries. The non-profit Downtown San Mateo Association (DSMA) works on behalf of downtown businesses to promote them and improve the downtown area.

Central Park is considered to be San Mateo's signature park with a baseball field, tennis courts, sculptures, picnic areas, playground, Japanese tea garden, recreation center, miniature train, rose garden and the San Mateo Arboretum. The  property was purchased by the city in 1922. A historically influential area for the Japanese-American community, the downtown is home to many Japanese restaurants and shops. A large, 12-screen movie theater complex is located off the Main Street alley between 2nd and 3rd Ave. The San Mateo Caltrain station is situated downtown. The area also contains many large and small multi-story office buildings, apartments, government buildings and Mills Medical Center.

Segments of South B Street between 1st and 3rd Ave. and the southbound lane between Baldwin and 1st Ave. were temporarily closed to vehicular traffic in 2020 to allow for expanded outdoor dining. The San Mateo City Council extended the temporary closure through the end of 2021 and voted in September 2021 to create a permanent pedestrian mall between 1st and 3rd Ave. The plan requires a  fire lane in the center of the street for public safety vehicles and necessary garbage or delivery services. The city aims to conduct the project in two phases: First, by installing retractable bollards and updating traffic signals and signage, then by raising the level of the street to be flush with sidewalk and reimagining its landscaping.

Bay Meadows

The Bay Meadows neighborhood is an  mixed-use transit-oriented development on the site of the former Bay Meadows Racetrack, a horse racing venue that closed in 2008. The area includes hundreds of new residential units, office space, retail space and parks and a town square. Ground broke in 2012 and construction on various projects continues as of 2021.

Hillsdale
Hillsdale Shopping Center is a mall in San Mateo County, featuring over 120 stores in the mall itself and surrounded by many big box stores. Tenants include anchors Nordstrom,  Ethan Allen and Macy's. The construction of a new food court and the outdoor North Block Plaza expanded the mall in 2019. New entertainment additions include luxury movie theater Cinépolis and a Pinstripes bowling alley off El Camino Real. The Hillsdale Caltrain station is located across El Camino.

Climate

San Mateo has a Mediterranean climate with warm, dry summers and mild, damp winters. The city is generally shielded from the Pacific Ocean by the Montara Mountain block of the Santa Cruz Mountains, but two gaps in the mountains (the San Bruno Gap, between Montara Mountain and San Bruno Mountain; and the Crystal Springs Gap, near where State Route 92 meets State Route 35, west of the College of San Mateo) can channel ocean weather, resulting in gusty afternoon winds that bring fog toward San Mateo in the late afternoon through early morning in the summer.

Annual precipitation averaged  of rainfall, falling on an average of 60 days each year. Based on comparison with the existing NWS office at San Francisco International Airport, San Mateo is generally a few degrees warmer in summer than the airport and a few degrees cooler in winter, while annual precipitation is almost the same at the airport and in San Mateo. In recent years, daily temperature reports for San Mateo from local weather observers have been published in the San Mateo Times and the San Francisco Chronicle.

Demographics

The 2010 United States Census reported that San Mateo had a population of 97,207. The racial makeup of San Mateo was 56,214 (46.8%) White, 2,296 (2.4%) African American, 505 (0.5%) Native American, 18,384 (18.9%) Asian (7.9% Chinese, 4.6% Filipino, 2.2% Japanese, 1.8% Indian, 0.8% Korean, 0.3% Vietnamese, 0.2% Thai), 1,998 (2.1%) Pacific Islander (1.2% Tongan, 0.3% Fijian, 0.2% Samoan, 0.1% Hawaiian), 12,264 (12.6%) from other races, and 5,546 (5.7%) from two or more races. Hispanic or Latino of any race were 25,815 persons (26.6%); 14.4% of San Mateo is Mexican, 2.8% Guatemalan, 2.6% Salvadoran, 1.2% Peruvian, 0.9% Nicaraguan, 0.5% Puerto Rican, 0.3% Colombian, 0.3% Chilean, 0.2% Honduran, and 0.2% Cuban.

The Census reported that 95,891 people (98.6% of the population) lived in households, 975 (1.0%) lived in non-institutionalized group quarters, and 341 (0.4%) were institutionalized.

There were 38,233 households, out of which 11,464 (30.0%) had children under the age of 18 living in them, 17,964 (47.0%) were opposite-sex married couples living together, 3,824 (10.0%) had a female householder with no husband present, 1,656 (4.3%) had a male householder with no wife present.  There were 2,098 (5.5%) unmarried opposite-sex partnerships, and 343 (0.9%) same-sex married couples or partnerships. 11,751 households (30.7%) were made up of individuals, and 4,391 (11.5%) had someone living alone who was 65 years of age or older. The average household size was 2.51.  There were 23,444 families (61.3% of all households); the average family size was 3.14.

The population was spread out, with 20,254 people (20.8%) under the age of 18, 6,915 people (7.1%) aged 18 to 24, 30,772 people (31.7%) aged 25 to 44, 25,286 people (26.0%) aged 45 to 64, and 13,980 people (14.4%) who were 65 years of age or older. The median age was 38.9 years. For every 100 females, there were 95.4 males.  For every 100 females age 18 and over, there were 92.8 males.

The homeowner vacancy rate was 1.5%; the rental vacancy rate was 3.7%. Of the population, 50,951 people (52.4%) lived in owner-occupied housing units and 44,940 people (46.2%) lived in rental housing units.

According to the 2011 American Community Survey 5-Year estimate, the median income for a household in the city was $86,772, and the median income for a family was $107,023. Males had a median income of $65,541 versus $60,491 for females. The per capita income for the city was $25,248. About 3.6% of families and 5.9% of the population were below the poverty line, including 6.1% of those under age 18 and 5.9% of those age 65 or over.

Government

San Mateo is structured as a council–manager form of government. The City Council has five members elected every two years to staggered four-year terms.    In 2022, the city began the process of switching from at-large elections to district elections.

According to the California Secretary of State, as of February 10, 2019, San Mateo has 54,946 registered voters. Of those, 27,502 (50.1%) are registered Democrats, 8,504 (15.5%) are registered Republicans, and 16,772 (30.5%) have declined to state a political party.

Economy

The economy of San Mateo is considered very diverse with jobs in the technology, health care, financial services, government, and retail trade fields being among the most numerous. Current and former companies based in San Mateo include Sony Interactive Entertainment, NetSuite, Franklin Templeton Investments, Fisher Investments, Solstice, Guidewire Software, Coupa, Snowflake Inc., Roblox Corporation, Marketo, SurveyMonkey, Devsisters USA, and GoPro.

The San Mateo housing market is one of the most expensive in the country. In February 2018, the median San Mateo home was valued at $1,463,900, and the median rent was ranked ninth in the entire nation, at $2,242 per month.

In the mid-2000s, the second stories of downtown San Mateo buildings became a hub for startup companies, including Roblox, GoPro and YouTube.

According to the city's 2021 Annual Comprehensive Financial Report, the top employers in the city are:

Education

Residents are zoned for schools in the San Mateo Foster City School District and San Mateo Union High School District. Elementary schools comprise Preschool, K-5, Middle and Magnet schools. There is a private, PreK-8 school: Saint Matthew's Episcopal Day School There are three public high schools: San Mateo, Aragon, and Hillsdale. There are also three private high schools: one all-male Catholic high school, Junípero Serra; one all-female Catholic high school, Notre Dame; and the Nueva Upper School. There is the Carey School.

The San Mateo Union High School District also hosts an adult school behind San Mateo High School. The San Mateo Performing Arts Center, one of the largest local theaters, is located on the San Mateo High School campus.

The city is home to the College of San Mateo, a community college.

Public libraries

The City of San Mateo operates three libraries within the city. The Main Library, the Hillsdale Library, and the Marina Library are all part of the Peninsula Library System. The Main Library located near Central Park in downtown opened in 2006 after residents passed a $30 million bond measure. Upon opening, the three-story,  building earned numerous design awards and was LEED-certified NC Gold. Floor-to-ceiling windows provide abundant natural light. The technologically advanced building is modeled after a retail bookstore.

Parks and recreation

San Mateo maintains more than 15 parks throughout the city. Central Park is considered to be the main one and hosts many community park functions that serve downtown residents. It has a Japanese tea garden to commemorate sister city Toyonka, Japan. The park also features a rose garden, a mini train and the San Mateo Arboretum.

Beresford Park is another large park that offers bocce ball and a skate plaza. Martin Luther King Jr. Park and Joinville Park offer swimming pools, while Ryder Park boasts a water play structure. Parkside Aquatic Park, located on Seal Slough, has beach swimming and volleyball. Many of these parks have picnic areas with grills, children's play areas, basketball and tennis courts, and baseball diamonds.

Coyote Point Park, near the border with Burlingame and on the San Francisco Bay, is a  regional county park known for its ideal location for windsurfing and sailing. It is also home to CuriOdyssey: a hands-on science museum and small native animal zoo.

Public art is located all around the city. One of the more memorable works is the large, brightly colored 1963 mosaic mural designed by Louis Macouillard and constructed by Alfonso Pardiñas. The mural is located in front of a mid-century-modern-style Bank of America branch at 300 S. El Camino Real and tells the story of A. P. Giannini, who founded the bank as the Bank of Italy.

Transportation

Freeways
San Mateo is considered to be near the center of the San Francisco Bay Area about halfway between San Francisco and San Jose, the region's two largest cities.  It is served by three major freeways, including U.S. Route 101, Interstate 280, and State Route 92.  State Route 92 east of San Mateo traverses the San Francisco Bay as the San Mateo-Hayward Bridge to the city of Hayward on its eastern shore.

Bicycling 
San Mateo has a network of bikeways connecting major destinations in the city. In 2011, the city approved a Bicycle Master Plan to establish bicycling goals, identify gaps in the existing bikeway system, and create a prioritized list of infrastructure improvement projects.

Public transportation
SamTrans provides local bus service within the city of San Mateo as well as the entire county of San Mateo. AC Transit provides transbay bus service via the San Mateo Bridge to Alameda County. Caltrain provides commuter rail service on the San Francisco Peninsula between San Francisco and San Jose. There are 41 northbound and 41 southbound trains with a stop in the city each weekday and 18 trains in both directions on weekends. Extra southbound trains are run to accommodate passengers after San Francisco Giants games. See public transportation in San Mateo County for more details.

Media

 San Mateo Daily Journal – Newspaper
 San Mateo County Times – Newspaper
 KCSM (FM)
 KPJK

Sister cities
San Mateo has two sister cities, as designated by the Sister Cities International, Inc.:

 Varde, Denmark (since November 17, 1969)
 Toyonaka, Osaka Prefecture, Japan (since October 8, 1963)

Notable people

Actors, entertainers 
 Lina Basquette (1907–1994), silent film actress.
 Barry Bostwick (born 1945), Golden Globe Award and Tony Award-winning actor and singer, known for The Rocky Horror Picture Show (1975), Spin City television show.
 Emma Chamberlain, internet personality 
 James P. Connolly, comedian, actor, and radio/television host
 Merv Griffin (1925–2007), television personality, creator of Jeopardy! and Wheel of Fortune
 Greg Gutfeld, television personality, author
 Dennis Haysbert, actor, known for Major League, Heat, 24, The Unit, and as spokesman for Allstate Insurance
 Jeff Serr, radio personality, voice actor
 Michael Trucco, actor

Artists, designers 
 Catherine Chalmers (born 1957), artist, photographer
 Joseph Eichler, real estate developer, known for affordable mid-century modern homes
 Sam Francis (1923–1994), Abstract expressionist painter.
 Jack Stauffacher, book designer, graphic designer, printmaker

Business 
 Charles W. Clark (1871–1933), copper industrialist, chairman of the United Verde Copper Company, former owner of the El Paloma estate in San Mateo.
 Amadeo Giannini, founder of Bank of Italy, moved to San Mateo in 1906.
 William Kohl (1820–1893) a founding partner of the Alaska Commercial Company, California pioneer, his former estate is now San Mateo's Central Park.

Musicians 
 Kris Kristofferson (born 1936), singer-songwriter
 Neal Schon (born 1954), musician, attended Aragon High School.
 Cal Tjader, jazz musician.
 Pegi Young (1952–2019) singer, songwriter, environmentalist, educator and philanthropist, born in San Mateo.

Politics 
 Jane Baker (1923–2011) first female Mayor of San Mateo, and City Councilwoman from 1973 to 1993.
 Chris Eachus (born 1955), serves in the New York State Assembly.
 Zoe Lofgren (born 1947), serves in the United States House of Representatives from California, she was born in San Mateo.

Sports 
Michael Allen (born 1959), professional golfer.
David Binn (born 1972), 18-season NFL player.
Tom Brady (born 1977), NFL quarterback, 7-time Super Bowl champion and 5 time super bowl mvp who played 20 seasons with the New England Patriots and three seasons with the Tampa Bay Buccaneers; born in San Mateo.
Ann Kiyomura, tennis player, Wimbledon doubles champion.
Auston Matthews, Professional hockey player for the Toronto Maple Leafs.
Sean Payton, Former head coach of the New Orleans Saints and current head coach of the Denver Broncos.
Kendal Smith, NFL player.
Lynn Swann (born 1952), Serra student, former NFL wide receiver for the Pittsburgh Steelers, four-time Super Bowl champion
John Wetteland, MLB pitcher.
Daniel Naroditsky, American chess grandmaster and popular YouTube and Twitch streamer.

Writers, poets, journalists 
 Kenneth Fisher, Forbes columnist, financial author, money manager.
J. Kenji López-Alt, American chef, food writer, author of The Food Lab.
 Lee Mallory, poet, editor, retired professor.
 John Matteson, Pulitzer Prize-winning biographer.

Other 
James Lanza, Sicilian-born mobster, boss of the San Francisco crime family

See also 

 San Mateo County History Museum

References

Further reading
 
 
 
 
 
 Mission Dolores, San Francisco, Register of Baptisms (1776–1870) and Register of Deaths (1776–1876)
 
 
 
 
 U.S. Bureau of Land Management, FN 254-21 (1853)

External links

 
 San Mateo CERT (Community Emergency Response Team)
 San Mateo Public Library

 
1894 establishments in California
Butterfield Overland Mail in California
Cities in San Mateo County, California
Cities in the San Francisco Bay Area
Incorporated cities and towns in California
Populated places established in 1894
Populated coastal places in California